Radstock Bay is a waterway in Qikiqtaaluk Region, Nunavut, Canada. It lies off the southern coast of Devon Island in the eastern high Arctic. Like Maxwell Bay to the east, it is an arm of Lancaster Sound and Barrow Strait.

Cape Liddon, on its western headland, has significant populations of black guillemot and northern fulmar.

References

Bays of Qikiqtaaluk Region